The rotatores muscles (rotatores spinae muscles) lie beneath the multifidus and are present in all spinal regions but are most prominent in the thoracic region; they are eleven in number on either side.

Each muscle is small and somewhat quadrilateral in form; it arises from the superior and posterior part of the transverse process, and is inserted into the lower border and lateral surface of the lamina of the vertebra above, the fibers extending as far as the root of the spinous process.

The first thoracic rotatores muscle is found between the first and second thoracic vertebrae; the last, between the eleventh and twelfth. Sometimes the number of these muscles is diminished by the absence of one or more from the upper or lower end. The Rotatores muscles have a high density of proprioceptors and have been implicated in postural control.

See also
Multifidus muscle

References

External links

Muscles of the torso